Mihrimah Sultan ("sun and moon" or "light of the moon") was an Ottoman princess, daughter of Sultan Murad III (reign 1574–1595) and perphaps Safiye Sultan, and sister of Sultan Mehmed III (reign 1595–1603) of the Ottoman Empire.

Birth

It is not known for sure who her mother was. There are hits that most often claim that she was the daughter of unknown concubine and that she was suggestly born in 1592. The main evidence of this is the date of his first known marriage, placed between 1604 and 1613. 

The Ottoman Register indicates that in 1595, when her father died, she was among his eldest daughters, which indicates that she may have been the daughter of Safiye Sultan. If that is true, she was not born before 1578-79. It would also make sense if she was born shortly after the death of Mihrimah Sultan,a daughter of Suleiman the Magnificent, in whose honor she was named. If she was Safiye's daughter, she had at least two full brothers, Mehmed III and Şehzade Mahmud, and three full sisters, Hümaşah Sultan, Ayşe Sultan and Fatma Sultan.

Marriages
Mihrimah most likely married for the first time during the time of her brother Mehmed III, but as the details of his Harem are poorly preserved, it cannot be proven when she was married.  Her first known marriage is marriage to Mihrahur Ahmed Pasha in 1613.  Some sources even mention that she was even married to him in 1604. Ahmed Pasha was the governor of Rumelia in 1614 and after that was appointed as governor of Damascus.

After Ahmed Pasha died in 1618, she married Çerkes Mehmed Ali Pasha. Mehmed Ali Pasha took the place of the governor of Damascus in 1618, so it can be assumed that she was probably married to him in the same year after death of her husband. 
During reign of Murad IV, he became Grand Vizier in 1624, until he died in Tokat on January 28, 1625. 
It is not known if she had issue from these marriages.

Death
The further life of Mihrimah Sultan is not known, as well as whether she had more marriages.
She probably died during the reign of Murad IV, but this has not been confirmed. When she died, she was buried in the Mausoleum of Murad III, which is located in the courtyard of the Hagia Sophia.

References

Bibliography
 
 

1579 births
1630s deaths
Year of death uncertain
17th-century Ottoman princesses
Royalty from Istanbul
16th-century Ottoman princesses